Big Moose Lake, at the head of the Moose River, is a large lake about  north of Fourth Lake in the Adirondacks in upstate New York. The lake is within both Herkimer and Hamilton counties, and covers portions of the towns of Webb and Long Lake. Located southwest of the lake is the hamlet of Big Moose.

The lake's popularity derives from its remoteness, climate and beauty. It was the scene of the murder of Grace Brown in 1906 by her boyfriend. Alleged spectral sightings and subsequent media attention are said to have added to the allure.

Geography and climate

Communities and recreation
Located southwest of the lake is the hamlet of Big Moose; other nearby communities include Eagle Bay, Inlet, Old Forge, and Thendara. With minimal road access, the lake's shore had not been developed very much. The population reaches a peak during the summer months, when vacationers arrive to stay at summer homes or local resorts.

The lake and its surrounding region are a popular spot for tourists year-round; boating, water-skiing, hiking and train rides from Thendara are available in the summer, and cross-country skiing and snowmobiling take place in the winter. It is home to the Big Moose Water Ski Club, whose members are  residents of the region.

The  Pigeon Lake Wilderness Area lies just east of the lake.

Fishing

Big Moose lake also offers sport fishing opportunities for brook trout, lake trout, yellow perch, brown trout, and splake. There is a no state-owned boat launch; however, a commercial marina with a ramp is located on the south shore of West Bay.

History

The lake's region was settled by European Americans primarily during the late 19th and early 20th centuries, as people gained access to the region by the first railroad constructed through the uninhabited Adirondack wilderness. Early trappers and hunters of the Adirondacks became guides there, eventually establishing permanent camps and hotels. Wealthy businessmen built large, private summer homes and their families lived here for the season, in the style of the Great Camps of the Vanderbilts and Morgans. Some of these lodges still exist.

The Big Moose Lake area is historically significant for its palisade architectural style, which  used vertical half-log construction in lodges and cabins.

Representation in culture
Big Moose Lake was the setting of An American Tragedy, a novel by Theodore Dreiser. He based his book on the historic events of the drowning murder of Grace Brown in the South Bay of Big Moose Lake in the early part of the 20th century. Her boyfriend Chester Gillette was convicted and executed for her murder.  (Dreiser named the lake where the murder took place as Big Bittern Lake, after having visited Big Moose Lake, and used it as a model for his fictional version.)

A Place in the Sun, a film starring Elizabeth Taylor, Shelley Winters, and Montgomery Clift, was an adaptation of the novel and won six Oscars

Claims of ghost sightings around the lake and associated with Grace Brown continue to be recorded. In 1996, the television series Unsolved Mysteries aired an episode that reenacted the events. It reported two such ghost sightings. On July 11, 2006 some residents organized a wreath-laying ceremony on South Bay to memorialize the centennial of Brown's murder. People participated from a small flotilla of watercraft.

Jennifer Donnelly based her historical novel, A Northern Light (2003), on this murder. She explores events from the perspective of a young girl working at the Glenmore (a lodge on the lake). Robert Tucker also set his novel, Sasquatch Camp (2013), in this community.

Historic places
The following places are listed on the National Register of Historic Places:
Covewood Lodge (listed in 2004)
Big Moose Community Chapel (listed in 2012)

Gallery

References

Further reading

External links
People v. Gillette Court Transcript

Glacial lakes of the United States
Lakes of Hamilton County, New York
Lakes of Herkimer County, New York
Tourist attractions in Hamilton County, New York
Tourist attractions in Herkimer County, New York
Reportedly haunted locations in New York (state)